William X may refer to:

 William X of Aquitaine (1099–1137)
 Guglielmo X Gonzaga, Duke of Mantua (1538–1587)